Tilleorg Landscape Conservation Area is a nature park in Põlva County, Estonia.

The area of the nature park is 146 ha.

The protected area was founded in 1957 to protect .

References

Nature reserves in Estonia
Geography of Põlva County